In a randomized experiment, allocation concealment hides the sorting of trial participants into treatment groups so that this knowledge cannot be exploited. Adequate allocation concealment serves to prevent study participants from influencing treatment allocations for subjects. Studies with poor allocation concealment (or none at all) are prone to selection bias.

Some standard methods of ensuring allocation concealment include sequentially numbered, opaque, sealed envelopes (SNOSE); sequentially numbered containers; pharmacy controlled randomization; and central randomization. CONSORT guidelines recommend that allocation concealment methods be included in a study's protocol, and that the allocation concealment methods be reported in detail in their publication; however, a 2005 study determined that most clinical trials have unclear allocation concealment in their protocols, in their publications, or both. A 2008 study of 146 meta-analyses concluded that the results of randomized controlled trials with inadequate or unclear allocation concealment tended to be biased toward beneficial effects only if the trials' outcomes were subjective as opposed to objective.

Allocation concealment is different from blinding. An allocation concealment method prevents influence on the randomization process, while blinding conceals the outcome of the randomization. However, allocation concealment may also be called "randomization blinding".

Impact

Without the use of allocation concealment, researchers may (consciously or unconsciously) place subjects expected to have good outcomes in the treatment group, and those expected to have poor outcomes in the control group. This introduces considerable bias in favor of treatment.

Naming
Allocation concealment has also been called randomization blinding, blinded randomization, and bias-reducing allocation among other names. The term 'allocation concealment' was first introduced by Shultz et al. The authors justified the introduction of the term:

Subversion and fraud
Traditionally, each patient's treatment allocation data was stored in a sealed envelopes, which was to be opened to determine treatment allocation. However, this system is prone to abuse. Reports of researchers opening envelopes prematurely or holding the envelopes up to lights to determine their contents has led some researchers to say that the use of sealed envelopes is no longer acceptable. , sealed envelopes were still in use in some clinical trials.

Modern clinical trials often use centralized allocation concealment. Although considered more secure, central allocations are not completely immune from subversion. Typical and sometimes successful strategies include keeping a list of previous allocations (up to 15% of study personnel report keeping lists).

See also
 Blinded experiment
 Design of experiments
 Randomized experiment
 Metascience
 Sealedenvelope.com—a provider of allocation concealment services

References

Design of experiments
Research
Scientific misconduct
Scientific method